St. Thomas the Apostle Church may refer to:

Australia
 Chaldean Catholic Eparchy of Saint Thomas the Apostle, Sydney, Australia

England
St Thomas the Apostle, Hanwell
Church of St Thomas the Apostle, Harty
Church of St Thomas the Apostle, Killinghall
Church of St Thomas the Apostle, Lymington
St Thomas the Apostle Rural, a rural parish church in Cornwall
St Thomas the Apostle (London), a former church

United States
California
St. Thomas the Apostle Catholic Church (Los Angeles), Roman Catholic church built in 1924
St. Thomas the Apostle Hollywood, California, Episcopal/Anglican church

Connecticut
 Saint Thomas the Apostle Church (Connecticut)

 Kentucky
 Church of St Thomas, the Apostle and Howard-Flaget House

Michigan
 St. Thomas the Apostle Catholic Church (Detroit)

Missouri
 St. Thomas the Apostle Church (Saint Thomas, Missouri)

New Jersey
 St. Thomas the Apostle Church (Old Bridge)

New York
 St. Thomas the Apostle Church (Manhattan)

Pennsylvania
St. Thomas the Apostle Church (Glen Mills)

Wisconsin
 Church of St. Thomas the Apostle (Beloit, Wisconsin), NRHP-listed

See also
St. Thomas' Church (disambiguation)